Cyrrhus or Kyrros, also known as Cyrius or Kyrius (Κύριος), was a town in ancient Macedonia. Sitalces penetrated into Macedonia to the left of Cyrrhus and Pella. 

It is located near the modern Aravissos.

References

Populated places in ancient Macedonia
Former populated places in Greece